A mastodon is a large, elephant-like mammal of the extinct genus Mammut (formerly Mastodon).

Mastodon may also refer to:

Animals
 Gomphotheriidae, an extinct family of elephant relatives.

Software
 Mastodon (software), open-source software for federated micro-blogging, similar to Twitter.

Places
 Mastodon Township, Michigan

Vehicles
 Mastodon (steam locomotive) (CPR #229), the very first steam locomotive of the 4-8-0 wheel arrangement.
 A nickname for the 4-10-0 wheel arrangement.

Music 
Mastodon (band), an American heavy metal band.
Mastodon (album), a box set released by the band's former label.

Comics and games
 Mastodon (Weapon X), a comic book character who plays a minor role in the backstory of Wolverine.
 Mastodon (New Universe), the code-name of one of members of the DP7 comic book superhuman group.
 Mastodon, a gigantic quadrupedal walker in the game Command & Conquer 4: Tiberian Twilight.

Sport and athletics
 Purdue Fort Wayne Mastodons, the athletic teams and mascot of Purdue University Fort Wayne.

See also

 
 
 Mammut (disambiguation)
 Mammoth (disambiguation)
 Elephant (disambiguation)